The Blue Choir of Sam Ratulangi University is a students choir of Indonesia that consists of around 50 singers selected from full-time engineering students at Sam Ratulangi University. Between auditions, each new choir meets around six times to learn new repertoire, tour both urban and rural parts of North Sulawesi, provide choral workshops for schools and to tour internationally. The choir has received international attention and critical acclaim from overseas audiences but limited publicity in Indonesia itself. Their repertoire, although widely varied in style, age and language, specifically emphasises works by Indonesian composers and music from Asia Pacific and other cultures. Performances by the choir regularly include commissioned works showcasing these uniquely North Sulawesi and Indonesian traditions.

History
Blue Choir was founded in 1989 with the name "The Bureau of Students Choir, Engineering Faculty", and legally became a student organization of the Faculty of Engineering, Sam Ratulangi University September 27, 1996, and began to use the name of "Blue Choir" in 1999. The choir presently has about 60 singers from four majors including civil engineering, architecture, mechanical engineering and electrical engineering with informatics joined in 2007 then urban planning joined in 2008 and they perform an extensive repertoire from Latin works to Contemporary Asian and Western song. The choir also occasionally participates in national and international choir competition and hold concerts in various churches the whole year. Nowadays, Blue Choir has renowned as one of the best choir in North Sulawesi.

Achievements

Publication of choral works
List of Choral Works sung by Blue Choir of Sam Ratulangi University in several competitions and concerts:

References

Indonesian choirs
Youth choirs
Student organizations in Indonesia
Musical groups established in 1989